Boles Independent School District is a public school district in unincorporated Hunt County, Texas (USA), near Quinlan. The district operates one high school, Boles High School.

General information
The district, founded in 1985, primarily serves Boles Children's Home, and was known as Boles Home Independent School District before the name change. Today the district serves the common public and is not only a children's home any longer. As of 2011, there is a waiting list to be a student at Boles ISD. The district's Superintendent is Dr. Graham Sweeney (named 2010 Superintendent of the year by the Texas Rural Education Association ).

The campus' fiber optic networking allows access to the Internet and the capability to extend that service to the Boles Children's Home. Thus, the community is linked to the school via fiber. The district offers distance education courses and training through Region X Educational Service Center. The district is linked directly via T-1 to Texas A&M – Commerce and several other school districts through ET-LINC."

Location and geography 
The  territory of Boles ISD brushes along Lake Tawakoni.

Finances
As of the 2010-2011 school year, the appraised valuation of property in the district was $16,435,000. The maintenance tax rate was $0.117 and the bond tax rate was $0.035 per $100 of appraised valuation.

Academic achievement
In 2011, the school district was rated "recognized" by the Texas Education Agency. Thirty-five percent of districts in Texas in 2011 received the same rating. No state accountability ratings will be given to districts in 2012. A school district in Texas can receive one of four possible rankings from the Texas Education Agency: Exemplary (the highest possible ranking), Recognized, Academically Acceptable, and Academically Unacceptable (the lowest possible ranking).

Historical district TEA accountability ratings
2011: Recognized
2010: Recognized
2009: Recognized
2008: Recognized
2007: Recognized
2006: Recognized
2005: Academically Acceptable
2004: Academically Acceptable

Schools
In the 2011–2012 school year, the district operated three schools.
Boles High School (Grades 9–12)
Boles Middle School (Grades 5–8)
Boles Elementary School (Grades PK-4)

Special programs

Athletics
Boles High School participates in the boys sports of basketball, football, track, and golf. The school participates in the girls sports of basketball, volleyball, track, and golf. For the 2012 through 2014 school years, Boles High School will play football in UIL Class 1A Division I.

Boles High School has various awards regarding the talent of its high school football team as they went undefeated for the regular season and were the 2008 Class A Division I State Semi-Finalists but lost to the Canadian Wildcats. They were also the 2007, 2008, & 2009 District Champions, and had three consecutive 10-0 undefeated regular seasons. The 'Stingerette' Drill Team also has various national recognition, especially for their high-kick routines. The Hornet Cheerleaders also have national recognition as a few of the members from the squad were fortunate enough to perform in the 2009 & 2010 Capital One Bowl. In 2014, the varsity football team went on to win the 2A-1 Region I District 6 championship for a second time in a row.

See also

List of school districts in Texas
List of high schools in Texas

References

External links
 
 Texas Rural Education Association 

School districts in Hunt County, Texas
School districts established in 1985